The 2010 Belarusian Premier League was the 20th season of top-tier football in Belarus. It started on April 3 and ended on 20 November 2010. BATE Borisov are the defending champions.

Teams

Gomel, Granit Mikashevichi and Smorgon were relegated to the Belarusian First League after finishing the 2009 season in the last three places. Due to the league reduction from 14 to 12 teams, only 2009 First League winners Belshina Bobruisk were promoted to the Premier League.

Team summaries

League table

Relegation play-offs
Torpedo Zhodino played a two-legged relegation play-off against SKVICH Minsk, the runners-up of 2010 Belarusian First League for one spot in the 2011 Premier League. Torpedo Zhodino won the play-off 3–1 on aggregate and retained their spot in the top flight.

Results

First and second round

Third round

Top goalscorers

Updated to games played on 21 November 2010 Source: football.by

See also
2010 Belarusian First League
2009–10 Belarusian Cup
2010–11 Belarusian Cup

External links
 Official site 

Belarusian Premier League seasons
1
Belarus
Belarus